Murder at the Savoy is a Swedish/German film from 1993, based on the 1970 book Murder at the Savoy.

Plot
A famous industrialist is killed at a restaurant in Malmö. When the police inspector Martin Beck in Stockholm gets the case, it is revealed that the industrialist is possibly involved in illegal arms deals. The police have only one question to answer: Who was the biggest criminal, the murderer or the industrialist?

Cast
Gösta Ekman as Martin Beck
Kjell Bergqvist as Lennart Kollberg
Rolf Lassgård as Gunvald Larsson
Niklas Hjulström as Benny Skacke
Ingvar Andersson as Per Månsson
Arthur Brauss as Jürgen Hoffman
Lena Nilsson as Åsa Thorell
Andrea Heuer as Hanna Mohr
Tommy Johnson as Bertil Svensson
Bernt Ström as Einar Rönn
Agneta Ekmanner as Greta Hjelm
Tova Magnusson Norling as Putte Beck
Ing-Marie Carlsson as Gun Kollberg
Görel Crona as Charlotte Palmgren
Marie Richardson as Helena Hansson
Reine Brynolfsson as Hampus Broberg
Anders Ekborg as Mats Linder
Claes Sylwander as Viktor Palmgren
Catherine Hansson as Karin
Birger Österberg as Kvant
Per-Gunnar Hylén as Kristiansson
Lena T. Hansson as Gunvald Larsson's sister
Jonas Falk as Stig Malm
Dan Nerenius as Bo, policeman in SÄPO
Max Lundqvist as Thomas
Jonas Bergström as naval officer
Lena Bergqvist as Hampus Broberg's secretary
Pontus Gustafsson as Edvardson
Nicke Wagemyr as policeman in Lidingö
Stefan Rylander as policeman in Lidingö
Thomas Segerström as shooting coach
Curt Spångberg as Backlund
Mikael Alsberg as doctor
David H. Ingvar as docent
Bengt Nilsson as waiter
Anna Lena Ahlström as Mats Linder's secretary
Stellan Skarsgård as security guard

References

External links

German mystery films
Swedish mystery films
Martin Beck films
1990s Swedish films
1990s German films